The Chapel of Saint Benedict is a Roman Catholic church located in Sumvitg, Surselva Region, canton of Graubünden, Switzerland.

After a 1984 avalanche destroyed a Baroque chapel on the same site, the Disentis Abbey decided to build a new chapel. Architect Peter Zumthor won the architectural competition for the project. The new chapel was built between 1985 and 1989 for a total cost of CHF 600,000. Jürg Buchli and Jürg Conzett were the engineers.

Awards 
 1992: 
 1994: Auszeichnung für gute Bauten Graubünden

References

External links

 
 Caplutta Sogn Benedetg - mit den Augen eines Chinesen betrachtet
 Toni Hildebrandt (im Gespräch mit Peter Zumthor): Architektur, Bild und Entwurf. In: Rheinsprung 11. Zeitschrift für Bildkritik. 1 (2011), S. 139–146. online (PDF; 965 kB)

Sumvitg
Churches in Graubünden
Roman Catholic chapels in Switzerland
Cultural property of regional significance in Graubünden